Riva Palacio may refer to:
Riva Palacio, a municipality in Chihuahua State, Mexico
Riva Palacio, the largest Mennonite colony in Bolivia, see Mennonites in Bolivia
ARM Riva Palacio, a minesweeper of the Mexican Navy

People with the surnames
Mariano Riva Palacio (1803–1880), Mexican politician and lawyer, three times Governor of the State of México
Vicente Riva Palacio (1832–1896), Mexican politician, essayist, novelist and historian
Carlos Riva Palacio, president of the Partido Nacional Revolucionario 1933–34
Emilio Riva Palacio, Governor of Morelos from 1964 to 1970
Antonio Riva Palacio López, Governor of Morelos from 1988 to 1994
Raymundo Riva Palacio, journalist for El Universal